Igor Tikhomirov (born 4 May 1963) is a Canadian (formerly Soviet) épée fencer.

He competed for the Soviets at the 1988 Summer Olympics, winning a bronze medal in the épée team competition. During the Soviet part of his career he trained at Dynamo in Moscow.

Tikhomirov won the bronze medal for Canada at the épée 2006 World Fencing Championships after he lost 15-6 to Wang Lei in the semi final. Same year he won gold for Canada at Pan American Championships.
He also represented Canada at 2008 Beijing Olympic Games where he finished 15.

He lives in Toronto where he runs the Sword Players Fencing Academy.

References

1963 births
Living people
Canadian male fencers
Russian male fencers
Soviet male fencers
Olympic fencers of the Soviet Union
Olympic fencers of Canada
Olympic bronze medalists for the Soviet Union
Dynamo sports society athletes
Fencers at the 1988 Summer Olympics
Fencers at the 2007 Pan American Games
Fencers at the 2008 Summer Olympics
Russian expatriates in Canada
Martial artists from Moscow
Medalists at the 1988 Summer Olympics
Olympic medalists in fencing
Pan American Games competitors for Canada